Donnie Scoggin (born August 12, 1962) is an American politician and nurse practitioner serving as a member of the Mississippi House of Representatives from the 89th district. Elected in November 2016, he assumed office in January 2017.

Early life and education 
Scoggin was born in Ellisville, Mississippi in 1962. He earned an Associate of Science in Nursing from Jones County Junior College, a Bachelor of Science in Nursing from the University of Southern Mississippi, and a Master of Science in Nursing from the Mississippi University for Women.

Career 
Scoggin began his career as an orderly at the South Central Regional Medical Center (SCRMC). He has since worked as an EMT, clinical nurse educator, emergency room nurse, and family nurse practitioner at the SCRMC. Scoggin was elected to the Missouri House of Representatives in November 2016 and assumed office in January 2017. Scoggin is also the vice chair of the House Universities and Colleges Committee. In 2019 and 2020, he was vice chair of the House Technology Committee.

References 

Living people
American nurses
Male nurses
1962 births
People from Ellisville, Mississippi
Jones County Junior College alumni
University of Southern Mississippi alumni
Mississippi University for Women alumni
Republican Party members of the Mississippi House of Representatives